Danville is a city in Des Moines County, Iowa, United States. The population was 927 at the time of the 2020 census. It is part of the Burlington, IA–IL Micropolitan Statistical Area.

History
Danville was founded in 1854.

Geography
Danville is located at  (40.863773, -91.315938).

Danville is located approximately four miles northeast of Geode State Park.

Demographics

2010 census
As of the census of 2010, there were 934 people, 362 households, and 262 families living in the city. The racial makeup of the city was 96.1% White, 1.8% African American, 0.2% Native American, 0.5% Asian, 0.2% from other races, and 1.1% from two or more races. Hispanic or Latino of any race were 1.3% of the population.

There were 362 households, of which 34.3% had children under the age of 18 living with them, 57.2% were married couples living together, 12.2% had a female householder with no husband present, 3.0% had a male householder with no wife present, and 27.6% were non-families. 24.3% of all households were made up of individuals, and 9.7% had someone living alone who was 65 years of age or older. The average household size was 2.49 and the average family size was 2.94.

The median age in the city was 38.9 years. 25.9% of residents were under the age of 18; 6.5% were between the ages of 18 and 24; 24.4% were from 25 to 44; 23.6% were from 45 to 64; and 19.7% were 65 years of age or older. The gender makeup of the city was 48.3% male and 51.7% female.

2000 census
As of the census of 2000, there were 914 people, 352 households, and 262 families living in the city. The racial makeup of the city was 99.02% White, 0.11% African American, 0.11% Native American, 0.22% Asian, 0.22% from other races, and 0.33% from two or more races. Hispanic or Latino of any race were 0.44% of the population.

There were 352 households, out of which 33.2% had children under the age of 18 living with them, 63.6% were married couples living together, 8.0% had a female householder with no husband present, and 25.3% were non-families. 23.0% of all households were made up of individuals, and 12.8% had someone living alone who was 65 years of age or older. The average household size was 2.50 and the average family size was 2.95.

Age spread: 24.4% under the age of 18, 8.6% from 18 to 24, 24.5% from 25 to 44, 22.0% from 45 to 64, and 20.5% who were 65 years of age or older. The median age was 39 years. For every 100 females, there were 90.4 males. For every 100 females age 18 and over, there were 89.3 males.

The median income for a household in the city was $45,357, and the median income for a family was $48,875. Males had a median income of $34,844 versus $18,162 for females. The per capita income for the city was $19,659. About 2.8% of families and 3.1% of the population were below the poverty line, including 3.0% of those under age 18 and 4.6% of those age 65 or over.

Education
The Danville Community School District operates local public schools.

Notable person
S. L. Mains, American football coach.

References

Cities in Iowa
Cities in Des Moines County, Iowa
Burlington, Iowa micropolitan area
Populated places established in 1854
1854 establishments in Iowa